KGFL (1110 AM, "The Trip Classic Hits 94.7, 97.3 & 1110") is a radio station  broadcasting a classic hits music format. Licensed to Clinton, Arkansas, United States, the station is currently owned by King-Sullivan Radio.

1110 AM is United States clear-channel frequency, on which KFAB in Omaha, Nebraska and WBT in Charlotte, North Carolina are the dominant Class A stations.  KGFL must leave the air during nighttime hours to protect the skywave signals of those stations. The FM translators on 94.7 MHz and 97.3 MHz provide 24 hour coverage of the classic hits format.

History
On April 3, 2001, the station's license, along with that of sister station KHPQ, was assigned by Weber-King Radio to the current owners, King-Sullivan Radio.

Previous logo

References

External links

GFL
GFL
Radio stations established in 1977
1977 establishments in Arkansas